Southern Luo is a dialect cluster of Uganda and neighboring countries. Although Southern Luo dialects are mutually intelligible, there are six ethnically and culturally distinct varieties which are considered to be separate languages socially.

Proto-Southern Luo has been reconstructed by Blount & Curley (1970).

Varieties
Acholi
Adhola-Alur-Luo
Adhola-luo
Alur
Kumam

References  

Luo languages
Languages of Uganda